María José Martínez Sánchez was the defender of title, but withdrew due to a knee injury.
Aravane Rezaï became the new champion, after she won in the final 6–3, 4–6, 6–4, against Gisela Dulko.

Seeds

Draw

Finals

Top half

Bottom half

External Links
Main Draw
Qualifying Draw

Swedish Open - Women's Singles
Swedish Open
2010 in Swedish women's sport
Swedish